Almost Heaven is the tenth regular studio album by European-American pop group The Kelly Family. Based on a concept by Dan Kelly, it was co-produced by Kathy and Paddy Kelly and released in 1996 throughout most of Europe. Following the major success of previous albums Over the Hump and Christmas for All and the number-one single "I Can't Help Myself," the album debuted number-one in Austria, Germany and Switzerland. It also entered the top 5 in the Netherlands and Norway and made it to the top 20 in Belgium. Almost Heaven eventually sold more than three million copies worldwide, making it the band's second biggest-selling release to date.

Track listing

Personnel
Credits are taken from the album's liner notes.

Instruments and performances

 Johan Daansen – mouth harp
 Angelo Kelly – drums, percussion, washboard, timbales, vocals
 Barby Kelly – vocals
 Jimmy Kelly – acoustic guitar, electric-zither, spoons, vocals
 Joey Kelly – acoustic guitars, electric guitars, vocals

 John Kelly – acoustic guitars, electric guitar, percussions, vocals 
 Kathy Kelly – accordion, keyboards, hammond, organ, piano, violin, vocals
 Maite Kelly – percussions, bass, vocals
 Patricia Kelly – harp, vocals
 Paddy Kelly – banjo, bass, guitars, keyboards, mandolin, tabla, percussions

Technical and production

 Album concept: Dan Kelly
 Writing: The Kelly Family
 Recording: Jan Shurman
 Mastering: Georgi Nedelschev, Dieter Wegner
 Mixing: Günther Kasper, G. Nedelschev, Kathy Kelly, Paddy Kelly, Max Volume

 Engineers: Günther "Mr. Cool" Kasper, Max Carola, Max Volume, Jürgen Lusky
 Engineering assistance: Alessandro Benedetti
 Photography: Thomas Stachelhaus
 Styling: Uschi Ries
 Litho: RGI Dortmund Germany

Charts

Weekly charts

Year-end charts

Certifications

References

External links
 KellyFamily.de — official site

1996 albums
The Kelly Family albums